Mysuru Road Bus Station (MRBS), is one of the four major bus stations that serve as mofussil bus station hubs for the city of Bengaluru, India. It is located on Mysuru road. The other three major bus stations in Bengaluru are Kempegowda Bus Station (KBS), Shantinagara Bus Station (SBS) and Basaveshwara Bus Station (BBS). It is the second busiest mofussil bus station in Bengaluru only after Kempegowda Bus Station. It started functioning in 2005.

Location and connectivity
MRBS is located nearly 2 km from Sirsi Circle near Gopalan Mall on Mysuru Road. This bus station has a separate area for outstation buses, a depot and separate bays for BMTC buses. It is well connected to other places like Vijayanagara, Jayanagara, Kempegowda International Airport(KIA), Kempegowda Bus Station(KBS), Krishna Rajendra Market, Shantinagara Bus Station(SBS), Basaveshwara Bus Station(BBS), Kengeri, Bidadi, Magadi Road, Nagarbhavi, and Peenya by bus.

Among Outstation buses, All KSRTC buses towards Mysuru, Madikeri, Virajpette, Kollegal, Chamarajanagara, Ramanagara, Male Mahadeshwara Betta, Kozhikode, Kalpetta, Kasargod, Tamil Nadu(only normal fare buses) start from here.  All Kerala SRTC , PRTC services start from here. TNSTC's normal fared buses start from this bus station to destinations such as Udagai(Ooty), Puducherry, Tiruvannamalai, Coonoor, Coimbatore, Hosur, Salem, Erode, Kanchipuram, Vellore, Vaniyambadi, Edappadi, Kallakurichi, Arni, Tirupathur, Villupuram, Chennai, Tambaram, Melmaruvathur and other places.

Depot
This bus stand hosts Depot-6 of KSRTC-Bengaluru Central division.

See also
 Bangalore Metropolitan Transport Corporation
 Karnataka State Road Transport Corporation

References

Buildings and structures in Bangalore
Bus stations in Karnataka
Transport in Bangalore